Andrea Trainotti (born 27 November 1993) is an Italian professional footballer who plays as a centre back for  club Trento.

Club career
Born in Rovereto, Trainotti made his senior debut for Eccellenza club ASD Alense in the 2010–11 season. In 2011 he joined Serie D club Virtus Verona. Trainotti signed for Mantova in 2014, playing for two seasons.

On 9 January 2017, he joined Monza. Trainotti returned to Virtus Verona on 26 June 2018. On 20 September 2019, he signed for Eccellenza club Trento, helping them gain consecutive promotions to Serie D and Serie C.

References

External links
 
 

1993 births
Living people
People from Rovereto
Sportspeople from Trentino
Italian footballers
Association football central defenders
Virtus Verona players
Mantova 1911 players
Bassano Virtus 55 S.T. players
A.C. Monza players
A.C. Trento 1921 players
Serie D players
Serie C players
Eccellenza players
Footballers from Trentino-Alto Adige/Südtirol